Enrique Boned Guillot (born 4 May 1978), commonly known as Kike, is a former Spanish futsal player who played as a Defender.

He was named the 2009 Futsal Player of the Year by Futsal Planet.

Honours
2 World Cup (2000, 2004)
5 UEFA Futsal Championship (2001, 2005, 2007, 2010, 2012)
4 Spanish Leagues (05/06, 06/07, 08/09, 09/10)
3 Spanish Cups (2003, 2008, 2010)
3 Spanish Supercups (2006, 2010, 2012)

Individual
1 World Cup Silver Ball (2012)
2 LNFS MVP (01/02, 05/06)
4 LNFS best Defender (00/01, 01/02, 05/06, 08/09)
 2009 Futsal Player of the Year

References

External links
LNFS profile
RFEF profile
UEFA profile
Futsal Planet profile

1978 births
Living people
Sportspeople from Valencia
Spanish men's futsal players
ElPozo Murcia FS players
Valencia FS players